Limours, often referred to as Limours-en-Hurepoix is a commune the Essonne department in Île-de-France in northern France.

Geography

Population
Inhabitants of Limours are known as Limouriens in French.

Pays de Limours
Limours gives its name to, and is the most populated town of, the Communauté de communes du Pays de Limours, which aggregates fourteen Essonne communes. The administrative seat of the communauté, however, is in Briis-sous-Forges rather than Limours itself.

List of Pays de Limours member towns: 
Angervilliers
Boullay-les-Troux
Briis-sous-Forges
Courson-Monteloup
Fontenay-lès-Briis
Forges-les-Bains
Gometz-la-Ville
Janvry
Les Molières
Limours
Pecqueuse
Saint-Jean-de-Beauregard
Saint-Maurice-Montcouronne
Vaugrigneuse

See also
Communes of the Essonne department

References

External links

Limours city council website 

Mayors of Essonne Association 

Communes of Essonne